Duncan Neale (born 1 October 1939) is an English retired footballer who played as a midfielder.

He began his career in non-league football with Ilford before signing professional terms with Newcastle United in 1959. He made his first team debut in 1960 and went on to make 88 league appearances in three years with the club, scoring eight goals. Neale joined Plymouth Argyle in 1963 and his versatility proved to be an asset, as he helped the club reach the semi-finals of the League Cup in 1965. He made 166 appearances in all competitions between 1963 and 1970, scoring nine goals, before returning to non-league football with Plymouth City.

References

1939 births
Living people
English footballers
Association football midfielders
Ilford F.C. players
Newcastle United F.C. players
Plymouth Argyle F.C. players
English Football League players
Plymouth City F.C. players
Sportspeople from Worthing